Spring Creek is a short river in southwestern Minnesota. It is a headwater to the Yellow Medicine River, which is a tributary to the Minnesota River. Springs are part of the source of the creek's water, hence the name. In the winter, the springs may cause the ice to be thinner and weaker over and downstream of the spring. Spring Creek flows entirely within the boundaries of Yellow Medicine County.

The shallow water can be completely frozen in the cold winters, which results in fish kill.  Increasing environmental pressures have degraded the amount of game fish present.  In past years, it was not unusual to find large Northern Pike and other predatory species.  Most fish caught are bullheads and carp.  Grasses and trees border the river for much of its length, and provides habitat for a variety of wildlife.  Due to the large number of trees edging the creek, there are many fallen trees which make navigation by canoe difficult or impossible.  Beavers have also taken advantage of the trees and built several dams.

Fish in Spring Creek
Bullhead
Carp
Northern Pike
Smallmouth bass
Other Rough Fish

See also
List of rivers of Minnesota
List of longest streams of Minnesota

References

External links
Hawk Creek-Yellow Medicine River Major Watershed. Minnesota River Basin Data Center
Hawk Creek-Yellow Medicine Watershed. Minnesota Pollution Control Agency.
Minnesota River Basin.  Minnesota Pollution Control Agency
Public Water Access, Lac qui Parle & Yellow Medicine Counties

Rivers of Minnesota
Rivers of Yellow Medicine County, Minnesota